Megahexura is a genus of spiders with the sole species Megahexura fulva. It is the only genus in the family Megahexuridae. Native to the United States, the spiders build an exposed sheet web with a funnel-shaped retreat in holes and crevices along ravine banks.

References

Monotypic Mygalomorphae genera
Mygalomorphae